Didone Abbandonata - Piano Sonata in G, Op. 50, No.3 is the final sonata composed by Muzio Clementi in 1821. It was titled after Metastasio's often-set opera libretto of the same name, and Clementi seeks to tell the tragic story of Virgil's heroine instrumentally. It is the only example of such a programmatic piece in the composer's oeuvre.

References

1821 compositions